Niccolò Galli (born 16 September 1988) is an Italian professional footballer who plays as a midfielder.

Career

Parma
Galli moved to Pergocrema along with Francesco Pambianchi in co-ownership deal for €500,000 in total and Diego Manzoni moved to Parma also for €500,000.

In June 2011 Parma bought back both players for €250,000 in total with Makris Petrozzi moved to Pergocrema in co-ownership deal for the same price. He left on loan to  Serie B team Hellas Verona .

Padova
In June 2012 he was exchanged with Jonas Portin of Padova. Galli signed a 4-year contract. 50% registration rights of both players were "valued" for €2 million, thus no cash was involved. In summer 2013 Padova swapped him with Luca Ceccarelli, both in temporary deals. Padova went bankrupted in summer 2014, with Galli still had a contract accounting value of around €2 million on 30 June 2014, in Padova's balance sheet.

Lega Pro
On 25 August 2014 he was signed by Carrarese in a 1-year contract.

On 13 July 2015 he was signed by Rimini. On 8 January 2016 he left for fellow Lega Pro club Renate.

References

External links
 AIC profile (data by football.it) 
 

1988 births
Living people
Italian footballers
U.S. Pergolettese 1932 players
Parma Calcio 1913 players
Calcio Lecco 1912 players
Hellas Verona F.C. players
A.C. Cesena players
Serie B players
Serie C players

Association football midfielders